Andrei Vladimirovich Topchu (born 17 April 1980) is a former Russian football player.

Career
He made his debut in the Russian Premier League in 2004 with FC Kuban Krasnodar.

External links
 
  Profile on the FC Kuban Krasnodar site

1980 births
Living people
Russian footballers
FC Kuban Krasnodar players
FC Moscow players
FC Amkar Perm players
Russian Premier League players
Association football midfielders